Isaac Garza Garza (June 3, 1853 – May 1, 1933) was a Mexican businessman who redirected to industry the interests of the Garza family which, according to Fortune Magazine, are the Mexican equivalent of the Rockefellers.

Mexican company founders
Businesspeople from Monterrey
1853 births
1933 deaths